Reserve or reserves may refer to:

Places
 Reserve, Kansas, a US city
 Reserve, Louisiana,  a census-designated place in St. John the Baptist Parish
 Reserve, Montana, a census-designated place in Sheridan County
 Reserve, New Mexico, a US village
 Reserve, Wisconsin, a census-designated place in the town of Couderay
 Reserve Mines, a community in Cape Breton Regional Municipality, Nova Scotia, Canada

Auctions
 Auction reserve, a minimum amount of money bid required for a sale, e.g., in an English auction
 No-reserve auction (NR), also known as an absolute auction, an auction in which the item for sale will be sold regardless of price

Economics and finance
 Reserve (accounting), any part of shareholders' equity, except for basic share capital
 Actuarial reserves, a liability equal to the present value of the future expected cash flows of a contingent event
 Bank reserves, holdings of deposits in central banks plus currency that is physically held in bank vaults
 Foreign-exchange reserves, the foreign currency deposits held by central banks and monetary authorities
 Reserve currency, a currency which is held in significant quantities as part of foreign exchange reserves
 Mineral reserve, natural resources that are economically recoverable
 Official gold reserves, gold held by central banks as a store of value
 Reserve study, a long-term capital budget planning tool

Land management
 Game reserve, land set aside for maintenance of wildlife, for tourism or hunting
 Indian reserve, a tract of land reserved for the use and benefit of a band
Indian colony, the concept in the United States
Indian reservation, equivalent concept in the United States
Indian reserve, equivalent concept in Canada
Urban Indian reserve, equivalent concept in Canada
 Nature reserve, a protected area of importance for wildlife, flora, fauna or features of geological or other special interest
 Open space reserve, an area of protected or conserved land or water on which development is indefinitely set aside

Military
 Military reserve, military units not initially committed to battle
 Military reserve force, a military organization composed of citizens who combine a military role with a civilian career
 Reserve fleet, a collection of partially or fully decommissioned naval vessels not currently needed.

Sports
 Reserve (sport), a player not in the starting lineup
 Injured reserve list, a list of injured players temporarily unable to play
 Reserve clause, part of a player contract in North American professional sports
 Reserve team, the second team fielded by a sports club

Other uses
 Aboriginal reserve, historical government-run settlement in Australia 
 Course reserve, library materials reserved for particular users
 Dynamic reserve, the set of metabolites that an organism can use for metabolic purposes
 Fuel reserve, an extra fuel tank, or extra fuel in the main fuel tank
 Injury Reserve, an Arizona hip hop trio formed in 2013
 Reserve Police Officers, auxiliary police officers
 Reserve power, a power that may be exercised by the head of state without the approval of another branch of the government
 Reserve wine, a wine that is specially designated
 Reserved, a Polish clothing store chain
 Stockpile, a reserve of bulk materials for future use

See also 
 Hold
 Layaway
 Native Reserve (disambiguation)
 Preserve (disambiguation)
 Reserva (disambiguation)
 Reservation (disambiguation)
 Reservoir (disambiguation)
 Western Reserve (disambiguation)